Oxyptilus variegatus is a moth of the family Pterophoridae. It is known from South Africa.

References

Endemic moths of South Africa
Oxyptilini
Moths of Africa
Plume moths of Africa
Moths described in 1920